Roger Sidney Wilson (born September 18, 1946) is a former Canadian professional ice hockey player. After ten years of minor league play, he briefly played for the Chicago Black Hawks of the NHL in 1975.

References

External links
 

1946 births
Living people
Canadian ice hockey defencemen
Chicago Blackhawks players
Greensboro Generals (EHL) players
Ice hockey people from Ontario
Sportspeople from Greater Sudbury